The counts and princes of East Frisia from the noble East Frisian family Cirksena descended from a line of East Frisian chieftains from Greetsiel. The county came into existence when Emperor Frederick III raised Ulrich I the son of a local chieftain to the status of Imperial Count in 1464.

The most important ruler from the House of Cirksena was Edzard the Great (1462–1528), under whose leadership the Imperial County of East Frisia reached its greatest extent. During his reign the Reformation spread throughout East Frisia.

In 1654 the Cirksena were elevated to princes by the emperor. Charles Edzard, the last ruler from the House of Cirksena, died without issue during the night of 25/26 May 1744 (reportedly from a glass of buttermilk, which is said to have drunk after a hunt). Immediately thereafter, the county passed to King Frederick II of Prussia.

Medieval chieftains in East Frisia

Broke / Marienhafe

Tom Brok family
 1347-1376: Keno I tom Brok
 1376-1389: Ocko I tom Brok
 1389-1399: Widzeld tom Brok
 1399-1417: Keno II tom Brok (under regency of his mother Foelke Kampana)
 1417-1427: Ocko II tom Brok (under regency of his grandmother, Foelke); deposed, died 1435

Dornum / Nesse

Attena family
 ?-1410: Hero Attena 
 ?-1410: Lutet Attena (in Norderburg)
 ?: Eger Attena (in Westerburg)
 ?-1433: Sibet I Attena
 1433-1473: Sibet II Attena

Emden
 Abdena family

Faldern
Aildesna family

Greetsiel / Norden

Cirksena family
 ?-1430: Liudward
 1430-1450: Enno Edzardisna, son-in-law
 1450-1466: Ulrich, son, in 1464 was raised to Count.

Innhausen / Östringen
Tjarksena family

Langwarden / Innhausen / Knyphausen
Onneken, later named of Innhausen and Knyphausen family

Lütetsburg / Pewsum
Manninga

Neermoor / Leer

Ukena family
 Benno
 Uko
 1427-1436: Focko Ukena and his son Uko Fockena (1427-1432)

Osterhusen

Allena family
?-1406: Folkmar Allena

Rüstringen / Bant 
Wiemken (Papinga)

Wirdum
Beninga family

Counts of East Frisia

House of Cirksena

Table of rulers

See also

List of Countesses of East Frisia

Literature
Tielke, Dr. Martin (Hrsg.): Biographisches Lexikon für East Frisia, Bd. 1  (1993), Bd. 2  (1997), Bd. 3  (2001) Ostfries. Landschaftliche Verl.- u. Vertriebsges. Aurich
Martin Jhering: Hofleben in East Frisia. Die Fürstenresidenz Aurich im Jahre 1728, Hannover 2005
Heinrich Reimers: East Frisia bis zum Aussterben seines Fürstenhauses, Bremen 1925 
Ernst Esselborn: Das Geschlecht Cirksena, Berlin 1945
 F. Wachter: Das Erbe der Cirksena. Ein Stück ostfriesischer Geschichte und des Kampfes um die Vorherrschaft in Norddeutschland., Aurich 1921

 
 
East Frisia
East Frisia
History of East Frisia
House of Cirksena